The Abel equation, named after Niels Henrik Abel, is a type of functional equation of the form

or
.

Equivalence
The second equation can be written

Taking , the equation can be written

The change of variables , for a real parameter , brings Abel's equation into the celebrated Schröder's equation,  .

The further change  into Böttcher's equation, .

The Abel equation is a special case of (and easily generalizes to) the translation equation,

.     (Observe .) 

The Abel function  further provides the canonical coordinate for Lie advective flows (one parameter Lie groups).

History
Initially, the equation in the more general form

was reported.  Even in the case of a single variable, the equation is non-trivial, and admits special analysis.
 
In the case of a linear transfer function, the solution is expressible compactly.

Special cases

In the case of an integer argument, the equation encodes  a recurrent procedure, e.g.,

and so on,

Solutions

Analytic solutions (Fatou coordinates) can be approximated by asymptotic expansion of a function defined by power series in the sectors around a parabolic fixed point The analytic solution is unique up to a constant.

See also
Functional equation
Schröder's equation
Böttcher's equation
Infinite compositions of analytic functions
Iterated function
Shift operator
Superfunction

References

Niels Henrik Abel
Functional equations